Hispanic Enterprise Magazine, formerly Hispanic Trends Magazine, was a joint project of Editorial Televisa and the United States Hispanic Chamber of Commerce.  Its headquarters was in Miami, Florida. The publication is a source of news, features and information for every Hispanic entrepreneur and anyone affiliated with the Hispanic marketplace. In 2006, Hispanic Enterprise successfully launched its digital version.

Published in English, Hispanic Enterprise aimed at the business community of Hispanic entrepreneurs. It was primarily distributed to members of the United States Hispanic Chamber of Commerce, which at last count in 2005, numbered approximately 2 million in the United States, generating almost $300 billion in annual gross receipt.

In July 2008, the magazine was combined with PODER Magazine and started circulating under the name PODER Enterprise.

References

Business magazines published in the United States
Monthly magazines published in the United States
Defunct magazines published in the United States
Magazines established in 2002
Magazines disestablished in 2008
Magazines published in Florida
Mass media in Miami
2002 establishments in Florida
2008 disestablishments in Florida